John Wallis (1616–1703) was an English mathematician.

John Wallis may also refer to:

John Wallis (antiquary) (1714–1793), English cleric and county historian
John Wallis (Canadian politician) (fl. 1815–1872), Canadian politician
John Wallis (Arabic scholar) (c. 1674–1738), Laudian Professor of Arabic at the University of Oxford
John Wallis (publisher) (died 1818), publisher of board games
John Wallis (MP for King's Lynn) (c. 1567–1633), English merchant and politician
John Braithwaite Wallis (1877–1961), Canadian entomologist
J. E. P. Wallis (1861–1946), Anglo-Indian judge

See also
Jon Wallis (born 1986), English footballer
John Wallace (disambiguation)
John Wallis Titt (1841–1910), mechanical engineer and builder of a particular design of large wind engine